Stone Rural is a civil parish in the Borough of Stafford, Staffordshire, England. It contains 39 listed buildings that are recorded in the National Heritage List for England. Of these, three are at Grade II*, the middle of the three grades, and the others are at Grade II, the lowest grade. The parish contains areas around the town of Stone and includes the villages of Aston-By-Stone to the south, and Meaford, Moddershall, and Oulton to the south. The Trent and Mersey Canal runs through the parish, and the listed buildings associated with this are two bridges and two mileposts. The Moddershall Valley contained a number of watermills and what remains of some of these are listed. Most of the other listed buildings are houses and cottages and associated structures, farmhouses and farm buildings, and the rest of the listed buildings include churches, and a house later used as an abbey. The listed buildings within the town of Stone are in Listed buildings in Stone, Staffordshire.


Key

Buildings

References

Citations

Sources

Lists of listed buildings in Staffordshire
Borough of Stafford